151 (one hundred [and] fifty-one) is a natural number. It follows 150 and precedes 152.

In mathematics
151 is the 36th prime number, the previous is 149, with which it comprises a twin prime. 151 is also a palindromic prime, a centered decagonal number, and a lucky number.

151 appears in the Padovan sequence, preceded by the terms 65, 86, 114; it is the sum of the first two of these.

151 is a unique prime in base 2, since it is the only prime with period 15 in base 2.

151 is the number of uniform paracompact honeycombs with infinite facets and vertex figures in the third dimension, which stem from 23 different Coxeter groups. Split into two whole numbers, 151 is the sum of 75 and 76, both relevant numbers in Euclidean and hyperbolic 3-space:
75 is the total number of non-prismatic uniform polyhedra, which incorporate regular polyhedra, semiregular polyhedra, and star polyhedra, 
75 uniform compound polyhedra, inclusive of seven types of families of prisms and antiprisms,
 76 is the number of unique uniform compact hyperbolic honeycombs that are solely generated from Wythoff constructions.

There are 151 4-uniform tilings, such that the symmetry of tilings with regular polygons have four orbits of vertices. 

While 151 is the 36th indexed prime, its twin prime 149 has a reciprocal whose repeating decimal expansion has a digit sum of 666, which is the magic constant in a  prime reciprocal magic square equal to the sum of the first 36 non-zero integers, or equivalently the 36th triangular number. Furthermore, the sum between twin primes (149, 151) is 300, which in turn is the 24th triangular number.

In music
 The song 151 by Slick Shoes
 The song Cell 151 from Steve Hackett's Highly Strung album
 The song Psalm 151 by the Polish band Kult
 The song Oddfellows Local 151 by R.E.M. of the album Document
 The song "151" by Armando from A Bugged Out Mix
 The song "151" by Jedi Mind Tricks
 The song "151 Rum (J.I.D song)" by J.I.D
 The song "Hyakugojyuuichi" (151 in Japanese), the original ending theme of the Pokemon anime

In sports
The De La Salle High School football team's national-record 151-game winning streak from 1992 to 2004.
UFC 151 was cancelled due to a medial collateral ligament injury sustained by challenger Dan Henderson who was scheduled to face champion Jon Jones. Jones declined to fight a new challenger on an 8-day notice. This became the first UFC event in history to have been completely cancelled.

In other fields
151 is also:
 The year AD 151 or 151 BC
 151 AH is a year in the Islamic calendar that corresponds to 759 – 760 CE
 151 is the name of a Manchester-based company that sells a variety of household products
 The proof number of Bacardi 151 rum
 The total number of Pokémon in the first Generation, counting Mewtwo and Mew
 151 Abundantia is a main belt asteroid
 The atomic number of an element temporarily called unquintunum
 Samarium-151 is a radioisotope of samarium
 The IQ 151 personal computer
 MG 151 cannon was a 15 mm autocannon during World War II
 Combined Task Force 151
 Pan Am Flight 151 from Accra, Ghana, to Monrovia, Liberia crashed on June 22, 1951
 The 2.5 liter GM Iron Duke engine, also called the 151
 The human gene GPR151, or G protein-coupled receptor 151
 Psalm 151
 Sonnet 151

See also
 List of highways numbered 151
 United Nations Security Council Resolution 151
 United States Supreme Court cases, Volume 151

References

Integers